Video from Hell is a video released in 1987 by Frank Zappa. It is a compilation of pieces of music and video from a series of projects that Zappa presumably planned to finish and release for home video, including a companion video for the You Can't Do That On Stage Anymore series of albums, but those projects were ultimately never completed. Many pieces from this video had appeared on a one-hour Night Flight special entitled "You Are What You Watch". The music video for the song "G-Spot Tornado" features color 8mm footage that Zappa shot at a county fair in the early 1960s, while the music video for "Night School" features footage from the making of his feature film 200 Motels. It also features the music video for "You Are What You Is" which was banned by MTV. A guitar solo duet between Zappa and Steve Vai taken from the song "Stevie's Spanking" was later released on You Can't Do That On Stage Anymore, Vol. 4. As of December 2011, the video has not yet been released on DVD.

Titled similarly to 1986's Jazz from Hell instrumental album, the title is explained as a political reference by Zappa: "Things in America can be from hell. Right now we have a president from hell [Reagan], and a National Security Council from hell, so we should add Jazz from Hell also."

References

External links

1987 video albums
Films directed by Frank Zappa
1980s musical films
Films scored by Frank Zappa
1980s English-language films